Yuryatino is a rural locality (a village) in Kupriyanovskoye Rural Settlement, Gorokhovetsky District, Vladimir Oblast, Russia. The population was 5 as of 2010.

Geography 
Yuryatino is located on the Suvoroshch River, 16 km south of Gorokhovets (the district's administrative centre) by road. Sapunovo is the nearest rural locality.

References 

Rural localities in Gorokhovetsky District